Not as Good as the Book is the fourth studio album released by progressive rock group The Tangent. The Special Edition of the album includes a 100-page novella by Andy Tillison with illustrations by Antoine Ettori.

Track listing 
All words and music written by Andy Tillison.

Disc one - A Crisis in Mid-Life

Disc two - Throwing Metal at the Sky

"Four Egos One War" originally performed by Parallel or 90 Degrees.

Personnel 

Andy Tillison – organ, piano, Moog synthesizer, guitars and vocals
Guy Manning – acoustic guitar, mandolin, bouzouki and vocals
Jonas Reingold – bass guitar
Jaime Salazar – drums
Theo Travis – saxophone and flute
Jakko Jakszyk – guitars and vocals
With guests:
Julie King – lead vocals on "Ours"
Unknown Frenchman – violin on "A Crisis In Mid-Life"

Cover artwork by Antoine Ettori

References 

The Tangent albums
2008 albums
Inside Out Music albums